The 2005 AMA Superbike Championship is the 30th season of the AMA Superbike Championship

Season calendar

Superbike Season Calendar

AMA Superbike

Rider Standings

AMA Superstock

Rider Standings

Formula Xtreme

Rider Standings

Supersport

Rider Standings

References

AMA Superbike Championship seasons
Ama Superbike
Superbike